Shimonia timberlakei is a moth in the family Cossidae. It is found in the Democratic Republic of Congo, where it has been recorded from Eala.

The wingspan is 38 mm for males and 41 mm for females.

Etymology
The species is named after Jonathan Timberlake, the editor of Flora Zambesiaca.

References

Natural History Museum Lepidoptera generic names catalog

Metarbelinae
Endemic fauna of the Democratic Republic of the Congo
Moths described in 2013